was a Japanese film director.

Yamamoto was born in Kagoshima City. After leaving Waseda University, where he had become affiliated with left-wing groups, he joined the Shochiku film studios in 1933, where he worked as an assistant director to Mikio Naruse. He followed Naruse when the latter moved to P.C.L. film studios (later Toho) and debuted as a director in 1937 with Ojōsan. During World War II he directed the propaganda films Winged Victory and Hot Winds before being drafted and sent to China. 

After returning to Japan, Yamamoto's first film was the 1947 War and Peace (not based on the Leo Tolstoy novel), co-directed  with Fumio Kamei. Being a communist and an active supporter of the union during the Toho labour strikes, he left the studio in 1948 after the strikes' forced ending and turned to independent filmmaking. The left-wing production company Shinsei Eiga-sha, formed by former Toho unionists, produced his commercially successful Street of Violence (1950) and the anti-war film Vacuum Zone (1953), which film historian Donald Richie called "the strongest anti-military film ever made in Japan" in 1959. The 1959 Ballad of the Cart was produced by the National Rural Film Association.

In the 1960s, Yamamoto again worked for major companies like Daiei and Nikkatsu, directing films like Band of Assassins (1962), The Ivory Tower (1966) and  Zatoichi the Outlaw (1967). He died in Tokyo on August 11th 1983 at the age of 73.

Selected filmography

Films

Awards
Kinema Junpo Awards
Yamamoto received the Kinema Junpo Award for Best Director for Ivory Tower, which was also awarded Best Film.

Blue Ribbon Awards
Yamamoto won the Blue Ribbon Award for Best Director for Shōnin no isu and Nippon dorobō monogatari (both 1965). Ivory Tower was awarded Best Film the following year.

Mainichi Fim Awards
Yamamoto was awarded Best Director at the Mainichi Film Awards for Ballad of the Cart and Ningen no kane (both 1959), Ivory Tower, Men and War and Barren Land. Ivory Tower, Barren Land and Nomugi Pass were winners in the Best Film category.

Festival prizes
Ivory Tower was entered into the 5th Moscow International Film Festival where it was awarded the Silver Prize.

References

External links

Bibliography
 

1910 births
1983 deaths
Japanese film directors
People from Kagoshima